Trigonorhinus griseus is a species of fungus weevil in the Anthribidae family of beetles. It is found in Central America and North America.

References

Further reading

 
 

Anthribidae
Articles created by Qbugbot
Beetles described in 1876